The Custos Rotulorum of County Monaghan was the highest civil officer in County Monaghan. The position was later combined with that of Lord Lieutenant of Monaghan.

Incumbents

1656–?1670  Richard Blayney, 4th Baron Blayney
1761–1775 Cadwallader Blayney, 9th Baron Blayney
1775–1805 William Henry Fortescue, 1st Earl of Clermont
1805–1842 Warner Westenra, 2nd Baron Rossmore

For later custodes rotulorum, see Lord Lieutenant of Monaghan

References

Monaghan